is a Japanese aircraft and automotive engineer.

Career

Tanaka graduated from the Tokyo Institute of Technology in March 1939 and joined the Tachikawa Aircraft Company in April 1939. In October of the same year, he enlisted in the Army and evaluated new engines for army aircraft. In 1944, the Japanese Army sent him to his home company of Tachikawa to complete the design of the Tachikawa Ki-74. Tanaka's contribution was to add a pressurized cabin to Ki-74.

After the end of World War II, Tanaka repaired existing Tachikawa Ki-77 and Ki-74 aircraft for submission to the GHQ. 
On June 30, 1947, Tanaka joined the Tokyo Electric Car Company after it became independent from the Tachikawa Aircraft; it later changed its name to "Tama Electric Car Company" on November 30, 1949.

 After the Korean War broke out, the price of batteries rose significantly, while the price of gasoline fell. For this reason, Tama Electric Car started building gasoline-engine vehicles. As the company was essentially still an aircraft body manufacturer, they had to acquire automobile engines from outside. They bought engines from Fuji Precision Industries (one of the successors of the disbanded Nakajima Aircraft Company). Tama Electric Car changed its name to "Tama Motor Company" on November 26, 1951. In 1952, a new sedan was launched that was named "Prince," so on November 27, 1952, the company again changed its name, this time to the "Prince Motor Company."

Tanaka, as Design Department Manager, supervised the development of all Prince vehicles such as the Skyline, Gloria, and others under the supervision of his boss Ryoichi Nakagawa, a former Nakajima Aircraft engineer. Tanaka was promoted to Executive Director after Prince Motor Company mergered with Nissan. He retired from Nissan in 1983, and was appointed the Vice President of Nissan Diesel. In 1985, Tanaka retired from Nissan Diesel but remained an adviser to the company. He was inducted into the Japan Automotive Hall of Fame in 2008 along with Yutaka Katayama, also known as "Mr. K".

See also

Tachikawa Aircraft Company
Tachikawa Ki-74
Tachikawa Ki-77
Prince
Ryoichi Nakagawa
Shinichiro Sakurai
Naganori Ito
Nissan
Nissan Diesel

References

The History and the Biography of Jiro Tanaka (Detailed PDF document attached) (Japanese) - Japan Automotive Hall of Fame
From the Ki-74 to the Tama Electric Vehicles and the Prince Vehicles - Interview of Jiro Tanaka on Nov. 22, 1996 (Japanese) - The Society of Automotive Engineers of Japan (JSAE)
Carmakers owe success to warplanes - Military's brightest aircraft designers created Japan's automotive powers The Japan Times, Aug. 13, 2005

1917 births
Japanese automotive pioneers
Tokyo Institute of Technology alumni
Japanese aerospace engineers
Japanese automotive engineers
Nissan people
Imperial Japanese Army officers
Businesspeople from Tokyo
Japanese business executives
Corporate executives in the automobile industry
Living people
Imperial Japanese Army personnel of World War II